Salvation is a DVD that was released April 17, 2007, from West Virginia heavy metal band Byzantine via Prosthetic Records. It was filmed, directed, and edited by Donnie Searls, owner of Every Second Pictures. Shortly after release, any copy purchased from the band included a bonus DVD with content that wasn't able to fit on the main disc.

DVD contents
Interviews with the band and the album producers (pre and post Serpents)
Long-form live video consisting of six songs and a storyline setting up the plot for the song "Jeremiad"; the songlist consists of:
Kill Chain		
Taking Up Serpents		
Stick Figure		
Salem Ark
Red Neck War		
Cradle Song		
Five live bootleg performances:
Hatfield (recorded January 1, 2006 @ The Sound Factory)
Stoning Judas (recorded January 1, 2006 @ The Sound Factory)
Slipping on Noise (recorded January 1, 2006 @ The Sound Factory)
Five Faces of Madness (recorded January 1, 2006 @ The Sound Factory)
Justicia (recorded February 12, 2006 @ The Nanci Raygun)
Bass and guitar tutorials
On the road, behind the scenes footage
"Jeremiad" music video
In-studio footage, the making of the 2005 album ...And They Shall Take Up Serpents

Bonus disc
The Knee Injury
Transportation Issue
Wheelchair Shenanigans
Shoe Fight (feat. Demiricous)
Bad Milk

External links
 Trailer #1 for Salvation
 Trailer #2 for Salvation

Byzantine (band) video albums